Barbora Balážová (born 18 March 1992 in Topoľčany) is a Slovak table tennis player. She competed at the 2016 Summer Olympics in the women's singles event, in which she was eliminated in the second round by Li Fen.

References

External links 
 
 
 

1992 births
Living people
Slovak female table tennis players
Olympic table tennis players of Slovakia
Table tennis players at the 2016 Summer Olympics
Table tennis players at the 2020 Summer Olympics
Table tennis players at the 2015 European Games
Table tennis players at the 2019 European Games
European Games competitors for Slovakia
Sportspeople from Topoľčany
20th-century Slovak women
21st-century Slovak women